The National Progressive Unionist Party (commonly referred to as Tagammu) is a socialist political party in Egypt. Originally known as the National Progressive Unionist Organization, it was established as the left-wing faction of the governing Arab Socialist Union (ASU) and became an independent party after ASU's dissolution.

The party considers itself a defender of the principles of the Egyptian Revolution of 1952. It calls for standing against attempts to reverse the revolution's social gains for labourers, the poor, and other low-income groups.

History and profile

The party was established in 1977. The founders were two former Free Officers members, Khaled Mohieddin and Kamal Rifaat. Its membership consisted of mainly of Marxists and Nasserists.

Since 1978 the party has published a newspaper, Al Ahali.

The party boycotted the first presidential elections in 2005. It won 5 out of 518 seats during the 2010 legislative elections.

In the 2011–12 Egyptian parliamentary election, the party ran in the Egyptian Bloc electoral alliance. However, in late 2014 it withdrew from the Egyptian Front.

Platform
Rejection of religious extremism.
Building the character of the Egyptian citizens.
Ending the state monopoly over the media.
Raising awareness of environmental issues.
Developing the Egyptian industries.

Prominent Party figures
 Khaled Mohieddin – Party founder, former chairman, and a member of the Egyptian Revolutionary Command Council
 Kamal Rifaat – Party founder
 Sayed Abdel Aal- New Party Chairman

Electoral history

People's Assembly of Egypt elections

Shura Council elections

References

External links
Al Ahali, official paper of Tagammu

1977 establishments in Egypt
Arab nationalism in Egypt
Democratic socialist parties in Africa
Left-wing nationalist parties
Nasserist political parties
Nationalist parties in Egypt
Political parties established in 1977
Secularism in Egypt
Socialist parties in Egypt